Thimmapuram is a Suburb in the city of Visakhapatnam, state of Andhra Pradesh, India. It's in Northern part  of the city.

About
Thimmapuram is between Kapuluppada and Rushikonda, recent times this area is developing  rapidly because it's in beach corridor and this area is developing as educational and Hospitality Hub.

References

Neighbourhoods in Visakhapatnam